John Erik Butler Jr. (born December 4, 2002) is an American professional basketball player for the Portland Trail Blazers of the National Basketball Association (NBA), on a two-way contract. He played college basketball for the Florida State Seminoles.

High school career
Butler played basketball for Christ Church Episcopal School in Greenville, South Carolina, where he was coached by his father, John Sr., and was teammates with his younger brother, Jordan. As a senior, he averaged 20.1 points, 8.5 rebounds and 2.9 blocks per game, earning Upstate Player of the Year honors from The Greenville News. Butler was named Class 2A Player of the Year and led his team to the state championship. A four-star recruit, he committed to playing college basketball for Florida State over offers from Georgia Tech, Alabama, South Carolina, Vanderbilt and Wake Forest.

College career
On March 2, 2022, Butler recorded a career-high 16 points, eight rebounds and four blocks in a 74–70 win against Notre Dame. As a freshman, he averaged 5.9 points, 3.2 rebounds and 1.2 blocks per game, shooting 39.3 percent from three-point range. Butler declared for the 2022 NBA draft and opted to forgo his remaining college eligibility.

Professional career

Portland Trail Blazers (2022–present)
After going undrafted in the 2022 NBA draft, Butler joined the New Orleans Pelicans for NBA Summer League play. On October 3, 2022, he was signed to a two-way contract by the Pelicans for the 22-23 season. However, he was waived on October 10.

On October 20, 2022, Butler signed a two-way contract with the Portland Trail Blazers.

On February 26, 2023, Butler was assigned to the Stockton Kings by the Trail Blazers.

Personal life
Butler's mother, Casie, played college basketball for South Carolina. His father, John Sr., serves as head basketball coach at Christ Church Episcopal School.

References

External links
Florida State Seminoles bio

2002 births
Living people
American men's basketball players
Basketball players from South Carolina
Florida State Seminoles men's basketball players
Portland Trail Blazers players
Power forwards (basketball)
Sportspeople from Greenville, South Carolina
Undrafted National Basketball Association players